Kaya Turski (born May 3, 1988) is a Canadian freestyle skier. She is an eight-time Winter X Games champion in Women's Ski slope style. At the 2010 Winter X Games XIV held in Aspen, she won her gold medal with the highest ever slopestyle score at a Winter X Games with 96.66. One week after she won the gold medal in Slopestyle at the 2011 Winter X Games XV in Aspen, Colorado, ahead of Keri Herman and Grete Eliassen, she captured the silver medal at the 2011 FIS Freestyle World Ski Championships, behind Anna Segal of Australia. In mid-2013, she tore her anterior cruciate ligament.

Involved in aggressive inline skating in her early teen years, Turski had limited experience in skiing when she moved to Whistler from Montreal to train in the sport, aged 17.
She speaks English, French, and Polish. Her grandmother was a Polish skier who moved to Canada with her two sons after World War II.

Kaya currently resides in Montreal and Mammoth Lakes, CA. She participated in the 2014 Winter Olympic Games in Sochi.

On October 3, 2017, Turski announced her retirement from freestyle skiing.

References

External links
 

Living people
Canadian female freestyle skiers
Skiers from Montreal
X Games athletes
1988 births
Freestyle skiers at the 2014 Winter Olympics
Olympic freestyle skiers of Canada
Canadian people of Polish descent
People from Mammoth Lakes, California